The Syrian National Congress, also called the Pan-Syrian Congress and General Syrian Congress (GSC), was convened in May 1919 in Damascus, Syria, after the expulsion of the Ottomans from Syria. The mission of the Congress was to consider the future of "Syria", by which was meant Greater Syria: present-day Syria, Lebanon, Israel, Palestine, and Jordan. The Congress also intended to present Arab views to the American King-Crane Commission of inquiry. The Congress was considered the first national parliament in the modern history of Syria.

The Congress was attended by representatives from all parts of Greater Syria, including Lebanon and Palestine, and was headed by Hashim al-Atassi. Some participants showed support for King Faisal's demands, while others were beginning to question his willingness to make concessions to pro-Zionist groups. In its final report it pleaded that "there be no separation of the southern part of Syria, known as Palestine, nor of the littoral western zone, which includes Lebanon, from the Syrian country." The King-Crane Commission recommended "the unity of Syria be preserved" in response.

The  Congress declared an independent Arab Kingdom of Syria on March 8, 1920, proclaiming: 
The full and absolute independence of our country Syria, includ­ing Palestine, within her natural boundaries, based on a civil, representative form of government, protection of the rights of minorities, and rejection of the claims of the Zionists to Palestine as a national homeland or place of immigration for the Jews.

The new state intended to included Syria, Palestine, Lebanon and portions of northern Mesopotamia. King Faisal was declared the head of state. At the same time Prince Zeid, Faisal's brother, was declared regent of Mesopotamia. Hashim al-Atassi was named Prime Minister and Yusuf al-'Azma became Minister of War and Chief of Staff.

The Congress continued during the short-lived life of the Kingdom until July 17, 1920, when the French gave Faisal an ultimatum to surrender or fight, and Faisal surrendered, bringing to an end the Kingdom and dissolving its institutions.

Gallery

See also

References

1919 conferences
1919 in Mandatory Syria
Arab nationalism in Syria
Arab nationalist organizations
Palestinian nationalism
People's Assembly of Syria
Syrian nationalism

External links
The Congress resolutions from July 2, 1919 at: